Gand Island, also Ghent Island or Genteiland in Dutch is an ice-covered island,  long and  wide, lying at the north end of Schollaert Channel, between Anvers Island and Brabant Island in the Palmer Archipelago. It was discovered by the Belgian Antarctic Expedition, 1897–99, and named by Adrian de Gerlache after "Gand", the French form of Ghent, a city in Belgium where subscription drives were held to help finance the expedition.

See also 
 List of Antarctic and sub-Antarctic islands

External links 
 Info en photo's from the expedition to Ghent Island (29 januari 2008) 
 Gand Island on USGS website
 Gand Island on AADC website
 Gand Island on SCAR website
 Satellite image of the area of Gand Island
 long term weather forecast for Gand Island

References

Islands of the Palmer Archipelago